A perfect ruler of length  is a ruler with integer markings , for which there exists an integer  such that any positive integer  is uniquely expressed as the difference  for some . This is referred to as an -perfect ruler.

Example 

To verify this, we need to show that every positive integer  is uniquely expressed as the difference of two markings:

See also
Golomb ruler
Sparse ruler
All-interval tetrachord

Combinatorics